Statistics of Armenian Premier League in the 1996–97 season.

Arabkir Yerevan and BKMA Yerevan are promoted.

League table

Results

Top goalscorers

See also
 1996–97 in Armenian football
 1996–97 Armenian First League
 1997 Armenian Cup

Armenian Premier League seasons
Armenia
1997 in Armenian football
1996 in Armenian football